The 2019 Bolsover District Council election took place on 2 May 2019 to elect all 37 members of Bolsover District Council in England. This was on the same day as other local elections.

The election resulted in the Labour Party losing control of the council for the first time in 40 years after winning 18 seats, one short of a majority. Independents made gains largely at the expense of Labour, winning 16 seats.

Labour then won back the District Council in 2021 after 2 by election gains in Bolsover North and Shuttlewood and Pinxton wards. They have since had Liz Smyth (Ault Hucknall) join the Labour Group at Bolsover District Council in 2021, giving the Labour group a majority of 2.

Summary

Election result

|-

Ward Results

Ault Hucknall

Barlborough

Blackwell

Bolsover East

Bolsover North and Shuttlewood

Bolsover South

Clowne East

Clowne West

Elmton-with-Creswell

Langwith

Pinxton

Shirebrook North

Shirebrook South

South Normanton East

South Normanton West

Tibshelf

Whitwell

By-elections 2019–2023

Bolsover North and Shuttlewood by-election

The Bolsover North and Shuttlewood by-election in 2021 was triggered by the death of Labour councillor Pat Cooper.

Pinxton by-election

The Pinxton by-election in 2021 was triggered by the death of independent councillor James Watson. Following the two by-elections on 6 May 2021, Labour regained a majority on the council.

References

2019 English local elections
2019
2010s in Derbyshire
May 2019 events in the United Kingdom